Eugoa immunda is a moth of the family Erebidae first described by Charles Swinhoe in 1903. It is found in Thailand.

References

immunda
Moths described in 1903